"Ich bin die Sehnsucht in dir" (I am the longing in you) is a song by Die Toten Hosen. It's the lead single and the third track from the album Zurück zum Glück. The lead singer takes on the role of personified desire and describes his destructive, yet symbiotic relationship with an unidentified individual whom he addresses directly, possibly the listener.

Music video
The music video was directed by Philipp Stölzl.

It shows clips of various people and what they are missing (the word is shown on or near them): "to see you again", "warmth", "clarity", "to get to know my father", "a miracle", "a girlfriend", "to move the soul", "honour", "Maria", "to be young one more time", "forgiveness", "to be world champion", "courage", "justice", "a daughter", "to be somewhere else", "to fuck", "freedom", "respect".

Track listing
 "Ich bin die Sehnsucht in dir" (von Holst/Frege, Weitholz) − 4:03
 "Es geht auch ohne" (It's okay without) (Meurer/van Dannen, Frege) - 2:07
 "Niemandslied" (No one's song) (van Dannen, Frege/van Dannen, Frege) - 2:24
 "Fallen" (Falling) (Breitkopf/Frege) - 3:30

Charts

Weekly charts

Year-end charts

References

2004 singles
Die Toten Hosen songs
Songs written by Campino (singer)
Songs written by Andreas von Holst
2004 songs